Sgt. Pepper's is a tribute album consisting of covers of the entirety of Sgt. Pepper's Lonely Hearts Club Band by The Beatles. The album was recorded by Big Daddy in 1992 and features covers which combine the lyrics and some musical elements from the original Beatles versions with stylistic elements of certain genres and musicians, mostly ones popularized in the 1920s-1950s. The album's release coincided with the 25th anniversary of the original Beatles album.  It was the band's last album until 2013's Smashing Songs of Stage and Screen.

Artwork
The album's cover art was directly inspired by that of Sgt. Pepper's Lonely Hearts Club Band. It was designed by Michael Bryan with direction from Geoff Gans. It prominently features an acoustic bass and the background is filled with iconic figures, mostly comedic.

Reception
Sgt. Pepper's received moderately positive reception. People magazine called the album "a hoot" and said even "when the novelty fades, the tunes stand on their own blue suede shoes as music to boogie to, even when you’re 64."

Track listing

Personnel
According to Discogs:

Big Daddy
Bob Wayne – lead and harmony vocals, engineering
Marty Kaniger – lead and harmony vocals, acoustic guitar, autoharp
Tom Lee – lead vocals, backing bass vocals, electric guitar
Don Raymond – lead and harmony vocals
John Hatton – lead vocals on "Being for the Benefit of Mr. Kite", backing vocals, electric bass, acoustic bass, orchestration on "With A Little Help from my Friends"
Bob Sandman – tenor and baritone saxophone, flute
Damon DeGrignon – drums and percussion, engineering

Additional musicians and production
Tim Bonhomme – celesta, piano, Hammond organ and calliope
Ed Willett – cello
Nancy Weckwerth – french horn
Roberta Wall – backing vocals
Joanne Kurman-Montana – backing vocals
Kim Wilkins – viola
Calabria McChesney – violin
Bette Byers – violin

See also
 With a Little Help from My Fwends
 Easy Star's Lonely Hearts Dub Band

References

1992 albums
Big Daddy (band) albums
Beat poetry
The Beatles tribute albums